Oswald Arnold Gottfried Spengler (29 May 1880 – 8 May 1936) was a German polymath, whose areas of interest included history, philosophy, mathematics, science, and art, as well as their relation to his organic theory of history. He is best known for his two-volume work, The Decline of the West (Der Untergang des Abendlandes), published in 1918 and 1922, covering human history. Spengler's model of history postulates that human cultures and civilizations are akin to biological entities, each with a limited, predictable, and deterministic lifespan.

Spengler predicted that about the year 2000, Western civilization would enter the period of pre‑death emergency whose countering would lead to 200 years of Caesarism (extra-constitutional omnipotence of the executive branch of government) before Western civilization's final collapse.

Spengler is regarded as a nationalist and an anti-democrat, and he was a prominent member of the Weimar-era Conservative Revolution. Although he had voted for Hitler over Hindenburg in the 1932 German presidential election and the Nazis had viewed him as an ally to provide a "respectable pedigree" to their ideology, he later criticized Nazism due to its excessive racialist elements, which led to him and his work being sidelined in his final years. He saw Benito Mussolini, and entrepreneurial types, like the mining magnate Cecil Rhodes, as examples of the impending Caesars of Western cultureshowcasing his stark criticism of Mussolini's imperial adventures. 

He strongly influenced other historians, including Franz Borkenau and especially Arnold J. Toynbee, and other successors including Francis Parker Yockey, Carroll Quigley, Samuel P. Huntington, and Oswald Mosley. John Calvert notes that Spengler's critique of the West is popular with Islamists.

Biography

Early life and family 
Oswald Arnold Gottfried Spengler was born on 29 May 1880 in Blankenburg, Duchy of Brunswick, German Empire, the oldest surviving child of Bernhard Spengler (1844–1901) and Pauline Spengler (1840–1910), née Grantzow, the descendant of an artistic family. Oswald's elder brother was born prematurely in 1879, when his mother tried to move a heavy laundry basket, and died at the age of three weeks. Oswald was born ten months after his brother's death. His younger sisters were Adele (1881–1917), Gertrud (1882–1957), and Hildegard (1885–1942). Oswald's paternal grandfather, Theodor Spengler (1806–76), was a metallurgical inspector (Hütteninspektor) in Altenbrak.

Oswald's father, Bernhard Spengler, held the position of a postal secretary (Postsekretär) and was a hard-working man with a marked dislike of intellectualism, who tried to instil the same values and attitudes in his son.

Spengler's maternal great-grandfather, Friedrich Wilhelm Grantzow, a tailor's apprentice in Berlin, had three children out of wedlock with a Jewish woman named Bräunchen Moses ( 1769–1849) whom he later married, on 26 May 1799. Shortly before the wedding, Moses was baptized as Johanna Elisabeth Anspachin; the surname was chosen after her birthplace—Anspach. Her parents, Abraham and Reile Moses, were both deceased by then. The couple had another five children, one of whom was Spengler's maternal grandfather, Gustav Adolf Grantzow (1811–83)—a solo dancer and ballet master in Berlin, who in 1837 married Katharina Kirchner (1813–73), a solo dancer from a Munich Catholic family; the second of their four daughters was Oswald Spengler's mother Pauline Grantzow. Like the Grantzows in general, Pauline was of a Bohemian disposition, and, before marrying Bernhard Spengler, accompanied her dancer sisters on tours. In appearance, she was plump. Her temperament, which Oswald inherited, complemented her appearance and frail physique: she was moody, irritable, and morose.

Education 
When Oswald was ten years of age, his family moved to the university city of Halle. Here he received a classical education at the local Gymnasium (academically oriented secondary school), studying Greek, Latin, mathematics and sciences. Here, too, he developed his propensity for the arts—especially poetry, drama, and music—and came under the influence of the ideas of Johann Wolfgang von Goethe and Friedrich Nietzsche. At 17, he wrote a drama titled Montezuma.

After his father's death in 1901, Spengler attended several universities (Munich, Berlin, and Halle) as a private scholar, taking courses in a wide range of subjects. His studies were undirected. In 1903, he failed his doctoral thesis on Heraclitus—titled Der metaphysische Grundgedanke der heraklitischen Philosophie (The Fundamental Metaphysical Thought of the Heraclitean Philosophy) and conducted under the direction of Alois Riehl—because of insufficient references. He took the doctoral oral exam again and received his PhD from Halle on 6 April 1904. In December 1904, he began to write the secondary dissertation (Staatsexamensarbeit) necessary to qualify as a high school teacher. This became The Development of the Organ of Sight in the Higher Realms of the Animal Kingdom (Die Entwicklung des Sehorgans bei den Hauptstufen des Tierreiches), a text now lost. It was approved and he received his teaching certificate. In 1905, Spengler suffered a nervous breakdown.

Career 
Spengler briefly served as a teacher in Saarbrücken then in Düsseldorf. From 1908 to 1911 he worked at a grammar school (Realgymnasium) in Hamburg, where he taught science, German history, and mathematics. Biographers report that his life as a teacher was uneventful. 

In 1911, following his mother's death, he moved to Munich, where he would live for the rest of his life. He lived as a cloistered scholar, supported by his modest inheritance. Spengler survived on very limited means and was marked by loneliness. He owned no books, and took work as a tutor or wrote for magazines to earn additional income. Due to a severe heart problem, Spengler was exempted from military service. During the war, his inheritance was useless because it was invested overseas; thus, he lived in genuine poverty for this period.

He began work on the first volume of The Decline of the West intending to focus on Germany within Europe. The Agadir Crisis of 1911 affected him deeply, though, so he widened the scope of his study. According to Spengler the book was completed in 1914, but the first edition was published in the summer of 1918, shortly before the end of World War I. Spengler wrote about the years immediately prior to World War I in Decline:

When the first volume of The Decline of the West was published, it was a wild success. Spengler became an instant celebrity. The national humiliation of the Treaty of Versailles (1919), followed by economic depression in 1923 and hyperinflation, seemed to prove Spengler right. Decline comforted Germans because it could be used as a rationale for their diminished pre-eminence, i.e. due to larger world-historical processes. The book met with wide success outside of Germany as well, and by 1919 had been translated into several other languages.

The second volume of Decline was published in 1922. In the second volume, Spengler argued that German socialism differed from Marxism; instead, he said it was more compatible with traditional German conservatism. Spengler declined an appointment as Professor of Philosophy at the University of Göttingen, saying he needed time to focus on writing.

The book was widely discussed, even by those who had not read it. Historians took umbrage at his unapologetically non-scientific approach. Novelist Thomas Mann compared reading Spengler's book to reading Schopenhauer for the first time. Academics gave it a mixed reception. Sociologist Max Weber described Spengler as a "very ingenious and learned dilettante", while philosopher Karl Popper called the thesis "pointless". Both volumes of Decline were published in English by Alfred A. Knopf in 1926.

Aftermath
In 1924, following the social-economic upheaval and hyperinflation, Spengler entered politics in an effort to bring Reichswehr General Hans von Seeckt to power as the country's leader. The attempt failed and Spengler proved ineffective in practical politics. 

A 1928 Time review of the second volume of Decline described the immense influence and controversy Spengler's ideas enjoyed during the 1920s: "When the first volume of The Decline of the West appeared in Germany a few years ago, thousands of copies were sold. Cultivated European discourse quickly became Spengler-saturated. Spenglerism spurted from the pens of countless disciples. It was imperative to read Spengler, to sympathize or revolt. It still remains so".

In 1931, he published Man and Technics, which warned against the dangers of technology and industrialism to culture. He especially pointed to the tendency of Western technology to spread to hostile "Colored races" which would then use the weapons against the West. It was poorly received because of its anti-industrialism. This book contains the well-known Spengler quote "Optimism is cowardice".

Despite voting for Hitler over Hindenburg in 1932, Spengler found the Führer vulgar. He met Hitler in 1933 and after a lengthy discussion remained unimpressed, saying that Germany did not need a "heroic tenor [Heldentenor: one of several conventional tenor classifications] but a real hero [Held]". He quarreled publicly with Alfred Rosenberg, and his pessimism and remarks about the Führer resulted in isolation and public silence. He further rejected offers from Joseph Goebbels to give public speeches. However, Spengler did become a member of the German Academy that year.

The Hour of Decision, published in 1934, was a bestseller, but was later banned for its critique of National Socialism. Spengler's criticisms of liberalism were welcomed by the Nazis, but Spengler disagreed with their biological ideology and anti-Semitism.  While racial mysticism played a key role in his own worldview, Spengler had always been an outspoken critic of the racial theories professed by the Nazis and many others in his time, and was not inclined to change his views during and after Hitler's rise to power.  Although a German nationalist, Spengler viewed the Nazis as too narrowly German, and not occidental enough to lead the fight against other peoples. The book also warned of a coming world war in which Western Civilization risked being destroyed, and was widely distributed abroad before eventually being banned by the National Socialist German Workers Party in Germany.  A Time review of The Hour of Decision noted Spengler's international popularity as a polemicist, observing that "When Oswald Spengler speaks, many a Western Worldling stops to listen". The review recommended the book for "readers who enjoy vigorous writing", who "will be glad to be rubbed the wrong way by Spengler's harsh aphorisms" and his pessimistic predictions.

Later life and death 
On 13 October 1933, Spengler became one of the hundred senators of the German Academy.

Spengler spent his final years in Munich, listening to Beethoven, reading Molière and Shakespeare, buying several thousand books, and collecting ancient Turkish, Persian and Indian weapons. He made occasional trips to the Harz mountains and to Italy. In the spring of 1936 (shortly before his death), he prophetically remarked in a letter to Reichsleiter Hans Frank that "in ten years, a German Reich will probably no longer exist" ("da ja wohl in zehn Jahren ein Deutsches Reich nicht mehr existieren wird!").

Spengler died of a heart attack on 8 May 1936, in Munich, three weeks before his 56th birthday.

Views

Influences 
In the introduction to The Decline of the West, Spengler cites Johann W. von Goethe and Friedrich Nietzsche as his major influences. Goethe's vitalism and Nietzsche's cultural criticism, in particular, are highlighted in his works.

 Spengler was also influenced by the universal and cyclical vision of world history proposed by the German historian Eduard Meyer. The belief in the progression of civilizations through an evolutionary process comparable with living beings can be traced back to classical antiquity, although it is difficult to assess the extent of the influence those thinkers had on Spengler: Cato the Elder, Cicero, Seneca, Florus, Ammianus Marcellinus, and later, Francis Bacon, who compared different empires with each other with the help of biological analogies.

The Decline of the West (1918)

The concept of historical philosophy developed by Spengler is founded upon two assumptions: 
 the existence of social entities called 'Cultures' (Kulturen) and regarded as the largest possible actors in human history, which itself had no metaphysical sense, 
 the parallelism between the evolution of those Cultures and the evolution of living beings. 

Spengler enumerates nine Cultures: Ancient Egyptian, Babylonian, Indian, Chinese, Greco-Roman or 'Apollonian', 'Magian' or 'Arabic' (including early and Byzantine Christianity and Islam), Mexican, Western or 'Faustian', and Russian. They interacted with each other in time and space but were distinctive due to 'internal' attributes. According to Spengler, "Cultures are organisms, and world-history is their collective biography." 

Spengler also compares the evolution of Cultures to the different ages of human life, "Every Culture passes through the age-phases of the individual man. Each has its childhood, youth, manhood and old age." When a Culture enters its late stage, Spengler argues, it becomes a 'Civilization' (Zivilisation), a petrified body characterized in the modern age by technology, imperialism, and mass society, which he expected to fossilize and decline from the 2000s onward. The first-millennium Near East was, in his view, not a transition between Classical Antiquity, Western Christianity, and Islam, but rather an emerging new Culture he named 'Arabian' or 'Magian', explaining messianic Judaism, early Christianity, Gnosticism, Mandaeism, Zoroastrianism, and Islam as different expressions of a single Culture sharing a unique worldview.

The great historian of antiquity Eduard Meyer thought highly of Spengler, although he also had some criticisms of him. Spengler's obscurity, intuitiveness, and mysticism were easy targets, especially for the positivists and neo-Kantians who rejected the possibility that there was meaning in world history. The critic and aesthete Count Harry Kessler thought him unoriginal and rather inane, especially in regard to his opinion on Nietzsche. Philosopher Ludwig Wittgenstein, however, shared Spengler's cultural pessimism. Spengler's work became an important foundation for social cycle theory.

Prussianism and Socialism (1919)

In late 1919, Spengler published Prussianism and Socialism (Preußentum und Sozialismus), an essay based on notes intended for the second volume of The Decline of the West in which he argues that German socialism is the correct socialism in contrast to English socialism. In his view, correct socialism has a much more "national" spirit.

According to Spengler, the West will spend the next and last several hundred years of its existence in a state of Caesarian socialism, when all humans will be synergized into a harmonious and happy totality by a dictator, like an orchestra is synergized into a harmonious totality by its conductor.

According to some recent critics such as Ishay Landa, "Prussian socialism" has some decidedly capitalistic traits. Spengler declares himself resolutely opposed to labor strikes (Spengler describes them as "the unsocialistic earmark of Marxism"), trade unions ("wage-Bolshevism" in Spengler's terms), progressive taxation or any imposition of taxes on the rich ("dry Bolshevism"), any shortening of the working day (he argues that workers should work even on Sundays), as well as any form of government insurance for sickness, old age, accidents, or unemployment.

Nazism and Fascism 
Spengler was an important influence on Nazi ideology. He "provided skeletal Nazi ideas" to the early Nazi movement "and gave them a respectable pedigree". Key parts of his writings were incorporated into Nazi Party ideology. 

Spengler's criticism of the Nazi Party was taken seriously by Hitler, and Carl Deher credited him for inspiring Hitler to carry out the Night of the Long Knives in which Ernst Roehm and other leaders of the SA were executed. In 1934, Spengler pronounced the funeral oration for one of the victims of the Night of the Long Knives and retired in 1935 from the board of the highly influential Nietzsche Archive which was viewed as opposition to the regime.

Spengler considered Judaism to be a "disintegrating element" (zersetzendes Element) that acts destructively "wherever it intervenes" (wo es auch eingreift). In his view, Jews are characterized by a "cynical intelligence" (zynische Intelligenz) and their "money thinking" (Gelddenken). Therefore, they were incapable of adapting to Western culture and represented a foreign body in Europe. He also clarifies in The Decline of the West that this is a pattern shared in all civilizations: He mentions how the ancient Jew would have seen the cynical, atheistic Romans of the late Roman empire the same way Westerners today see Jews. Alexander Bein argues that with these characterizations Spengler contributed significantly to the enforcement of Jewish stereotypes in pre-WW2 German circles.

Spengler viewed Nazi anti-Semitism as self-defeating, and personally took an ethnological view of race and culture. In his private papers, he remarked upon "how much envy of the capability of other people in view of one's lack of it lies hidden in anti-Semitism!", and arguing that "when one would rather destroy business and scholarship than see Jews in them, one is an ideologue, i.e., a danger for the nation. Idiotic." 

Spengler, however, regarded the transformation of ultra-capitalist mass democracies into dictatorial regimes as inevitable, and he had expressed some sympathy for Benito Mussolini and the Italian Fascist movement as a first symptom of this development.

Works
 
 , 2 vols. – The Decline of the West; an Abridged Edition by Helmut Werner (tr. by C.F. Atkinson).
 "On the Style-Patterns of Culture." In Talcott Parsons, ed., Theories of Society, Vol. II, The Free Press of Glencoe, 1961.
 Preussentum und Sozialismus, 1920, Translated 1922 as Prussianism And Socialism by C.F. Atkinson (Prussianism and Socialism).
 Pessimismus?, G. Stilke, 1921.
 Neubau des deutschen Reiches, 1924.
 Die Revolution ist nicht zu Ende, 1924.
 Politische Pflichten der deutschen Jugend; Rede gehalten am 26. Februar 1924 vor dem Hochschulring deutscher Art in Würzburg, 1925.
 Der Mensch und die Technik, 1931 (Man and Technics: A Contribution to a Philosophy of Life, tr. C.F. Atkinson, Knopf, 1932).
 Politische Schriften, 1932.
 Jahre der Entscheidung, 1934 (The Hour of Decision tr. C.F. Atkinson)(The Hour of Decision).
 Reden und Aufsätze, 1937 (ed. by Hildegard Kornhardt) – Selected Essays (tr. Donald O. White).
 Gedanken, c. 1941 (ed. by Hildegard Kornhardt) – Aphorisms (translated by Gisela Koch-Weser O’Brien).
 Briefe, 1913–1936, 1963 [The Letters of Oswald Spengler, 1913–1936] (ed. and tr. by A. Helps).
 Urfragen; Fragmente aus dem Nachlass, 1965 (ed. by Anton Mirko Koktanek and Manfred Schröter).
 Frühzeit der Weltgeschichte: Fragmente aus dem Nachlass, 1966 (ed. by A. M. Koktanek and Manfred Schröter).
 Der Briefwechsel zwischen Oswald Spengler und Wolfgang E. Groeger. Über russische Literatur, Zeitgeschichte und soziale Fragen, 1987 (ed. by Xenia Werner).

See also

 Arnold J. Toynbee
 Carroll Quigley
 Francis Parker Yockey
 Feliks Koneczny
 Samuel P. Huntington
 Social cycle theory
 The Decline of the West

Notes

References

Sources

Further reading

Theodor W. Adorno Prisms. Cambridge, MA: MIT Press 1967.

David E. Cooper. 'Reactionary Modernism'. In Anthony O'Hear (ed.) German Philosophy Since Kant. Cambridge: Cambridge University Press, 1999, pp. 291–304.
Costello, Paul. World Historians and Their Goals: Twentieth-Century Answers to Modernism (1993).

Fischer, Klaus P. History and Prophecy: Oswald Spengler and the Decline of the West. Durham: Moore, 1977.
Frye, Northrop. "Spengler Revisited." In Northrop Frye on Modern Culture (2003), pp 297–382, first published 1974.
Goddard, E. H. Civilisation or Civilisations: An Essay on the Spenglerian Philosophy of History, Boni & Liveright, 1926.

Kidd, Ian James. "Oswald Spengler, Technology, and Human Nature: 'Man and Technics' as Philosophical Anthropology". In The European Legacy, (2012) 17#1 pp 19–31.
Kroll, Joe Paul. "'A Biography of the Soul': Oswald Spengler's Biographical Method and the Morphology of History German Life & Letters (2009) 62#1 pp 67-83. 
Robert W. Merry "Spengler's Ominous Prophecy," National Interest, 2 January 2013.

In foreign languages
Baltzer, Armin. Philosoph oder Prophet? Oswald Spenglers Vermächtnis und Voraussagen [Philosopher or Prophet?], Verlag für Kulturwissenschaften, 1962.
Caruso, Sergio. La politica del Destino. Relativismo storico e irrazionalismo politico nel pensiero di Oswald Spengler [Destiny's politics. Historical relativism & political irrationalism in Oswald Spengler's thought]. Firenze: Cultura 1979.
Caruso, Sergio. "Minoranze, caste e partiti nel pensiero di Oswald Spengler". In Politica e società. Scritti in onore di Luciano Cavalli, ed. by G. Bettin. Cedam: Padova 1997, pp. 214–82.
Felken, Detlef. Oswald Spengler; Konservativer Denker zwischen Kaiserreich und Diktatur. Munich: CH Beck, 1988.
Messer, August. Oswald Spengler als Philosoph, Strecker und Schröder, 1922.
Reichelt, Stefan G. "Oswald Spengler". In: Nikolaj A. Berdjaev in Deutschland 1920–1950. Eine rezeptionshistorische Studie. Universitätsverlag: Leipzig 1999, pp. 71–73. .
Schroeter, Manfred. Metaphysik des Untergangs: eine kulturkritische Studie über Oswald Spengler,'' Leibniz Verlag, 1949.

External links

S. Srikanta Sastri. Oswald Spengler on Indian Culture
Works by Spengler, including his books, essays and lectures (in German)
Complete bibliography of Spengler's essays, lectures, and books, including translations, arranged chronologically
The Modernism Lab: Oswald Spengler
The Oswald Spengler Society for the Study of Humanity and World History

1880 births
1936 deaths
20th-century educators
20th-century essayists
20th-century German historians
20th-century German male writers
20th-century German philosophers
20th-century social scientists
Aphorists
Conservative Revolutionary movement
Continental philosophers
Cultural historians
Epistemologists
German anti-communists
German educators
German historians
German letter writers
German male essayists
German male non-fiction writers
German nationalists
German people of Jewish descent
German social scientists
German socialists
German sociologists
Historians of philosophy
Humboldt University of Berlin
Literacy and society theorists
Ludwig Maximilian University of Munich alumni
Metaphysicians
Metaphysics writers
Nietzsche scholars
Ontologists
People from Blankenburg (Harz)
People from the Duchy of Brunswick
Philosophers of art
Philosophers of culture
Philosophers of education
Philosophers of history
Philosophers of mathematics
Philosophers of science
Philosophers of social science
Philosophers of technology
Philosophers of war
Political philosophers
Political sociologists
Revolution theorists
Social philosophers
Theoretical historians
Theorists on Western civilization
University of Halle alumni
World system scholars
Writers about activism and social change
Writers about communism
German monarchists